Euxoa macleani is a moth of the family Noctuidae. It is found in western Canada.

The length of the forewings is 14–18 mm.

External links
A Synopsis of the westermanni Group of the Genus Euxoa Hbn. (Lepidoptera: Noctuidae) With Descriptions of Two New Species

Euxoa
Moths of North America
Moths described in 1927